Baharuia is a plant genus in the family Apocynaceae, first described as a genus in 1995. It contains only one known species, Baharuia gracilis, native to Borneo and northern Sumatra.

References

Flora of Borneo
Flora of Sumatra
Monotypic Apocynaceae genera
Apocyneae